Vale Canada Limited (formerly Vale Inco, CVRD Inco and Inco Limited; for corporate branding purposes simply known as "Vale" and pronounced  in English) is a  wholly owned subsidiary of the Brazilian mining company Vale. Vale's nickel mining and metals division is headquartered in Toronto, Ontario, Canada.  It produces nickel, copper, cobalt, platinum, rhodium, ruthenium, iridium, gold, and silver. Prior to being purchased by CVRD (now Vale) in 2006, Inco was the world's second largest producer of nickel, and the third largest mining company outside South Africa and Russia of platinum group metals.  It was also a charter member of the 30-stock Dow Jones Industrial Average formed on October 1, 1928.

Pre-Vale history

Founding of Inco
The company was founded following the discovery by blacksmith Tom Flanagan in Copper Cliff Ontario of chalcopyrite deposits, while the Canadian Pacific Railroad was being built. Initially, ore was shipped for smelting to a plant in Constable Hook, New Jersey, owned by the Orford Copper Company. Processing revealed in 1884 that the ore was also rich in nickel and exploration tests revealed an enormous potential.

Nickel mining started in Sudbury, Ontario in 1902, and that year, the International Nickel Company, Ltd. was created in New York, NY as a joint venture between Canadian Copper, Orford Copper, and American Nickel Works. In 1905, Monel alloy was discovered by Robert Crooks Stanley (1876-1951) and named for Inco Chairman Ambrose Monell (1873-1921). Meanwhile, the development of austenitic stainless steel was launched by a pair of Krupp engineers known today as AISI Type 304 or simply 18/8, which indicates a nickel content of 8%. This novelty would assure the 20th-century success of the firm.

In 1916, the International Nickel Company of Canada, Ltd. was incorporated in Copper Cliff in Sudbury; this entity was a subsidiary of New York-based Inco. The company built a new refinery in Port Colborne in 1918 and during the following year, the company first began using the trade name Inco.

In 1928, the corporation merged with the British-owned Mond Nickel Company; subsequently, a competitor mine by the name of Falconbridge Ltd. was founded. By 1931, Stanley had progressed to President of the firm. Between 1935 and 1939, sales exceeded 200 million pounds annually, which
was more than 80% of world consumption.

Head office to Toronto

A head office for the Canadian operations of Inco was established in Toronto. During World War II, Inco's Frood Mine produced 40% of the nickel used in artillery by the Allies. From 1939 to 1945, Inco delivered to the Allies 1.5 billion pounds of nickel. After the war, demand for nickel remained high because of the Korean War and the Cold War of the 1950s.

In its heyday during the 1950s, Inco produced 85% of the world's nickel supply. In 1956, geologists discovered the Thompson, Manitoba ore body and named it for Inco Chairman John Fairfield Thompson. The first Canadian-born President of Inco, who held the office between 1960 and 1966, was named James Roycroft Gordon.

The year 1969 saw a bloody four-month long strike at Inco's Sudbury operations, and the firm's share price was cut in half.

In 1972, it was decided by Chairman L. Edward Grubb, ostensibly to pacify the labour unions, to move the head office from New York to Toronto where it resided in the Toronto Dominion Centre. Also in 1972 the Inco Superstack was built in Sudbury. And in 1972, the Soroko project in Indonesia was begun together with involvement from six Japanese firms who together held a 40% share in the project.

The 1975 Inco annual report had a picture of a supersonic Concorde jet which used nickel and titanium alloy blades forged by Daniel Doncaster and Sons, a 1975 acquisition of Inco (Alloy Products) division. A picture of Prince Charles talking with a Doncaster operator of electronic blade inspection equipment lies alongside it. In 1976, the company’s name was officially changed to Inco Limited.

Inco also built and operated a facility that included a research center overlooking Blue Lake in New York's Sterling Forest area. That site was sold in the 1980s. The first hostile takeover on the New York Stock Exchange was led by Grubb, who successfully executed a merger with Philadelphia-based ESB, manufacturers of amongst others the Ray-O-Vac battery.

Downturn
During the first half of the 1980s Inco bled a lot of red ink, "which caused the elimination during the five years from 1980 of more than 12,000 jobs worldwide, or 35 percent of its work force, including more than 6,000 jobs in Canada." It then produced one-third of the world's nickel. Charles F. Baird was the chairman and CEO. By 1985 Inco (Alloy Products) division included: Doncasters Blaenavon Ltd Special Alloy Products Division, Doncasters Monk Bridge Ltd, Doncasters Sheffield Ltd, Doncasters Moorside Ltd, Beaufort Engineering Ltd, Whittingham and Porter Ltd, I.A.P.L. Technology Centre and Inco Selective Surfaces Ltd.

In late 1994, Diamond Field Resources discovered nickel, copper and cobalt ore bodies at Voisey's Bay Mine (VBM) in Labrador, Canada. The deposit was estimated to contain 141 million tonnes at 1.6% nickel and was imagined by the then-chieftains of Inco as a 21st-century replacement for the waning Copper Cliff resource. In 1996, the VBM was purchased by Inco for 4.3 billion Canadian dollars. Some say that Inco overpaid for VBM because of the presence of Falconbridge at the auction.

In order to generate cash Inco sold its manufacturing sites of nickel alloys to Special Metals Corporation in 1998 for US$408 million. In the previous year, the division had generated US$668 million in revenue. Special Metals Corporation however filed Chapter 11 in March 2002.

In February 2001, nine-year CEO Michael Sopko stepped down while he announced a $400 million profit. He was replaced by New York lawyer Scott Hand.

In 2002, the VBM purchase was regarded as a "costly blunder... when the company had to write down a third of the value of the $4-billion acquisition only six years after the purchase," but in early 2004 that did not prevent Hand from making a bid for Noranda and Falconbridge, both of which were at the time owned by Brascan, who then declined the Inco offer. The bait in the water attracted Mick Davis and Roger Agnelli. Hand was not deterred from his takeover madness and went to Australia to try his luck in the Western Mining sweepstakes, where he was outbid by XStrata's offer of US$5.7 billion and the ultimately successful BHP Billiton bid of $7.3 billion. Not last in the waters was Teck Cominco's Don Lindsay, a product of CIBC World Markets and who had advised Falconbridge in their failed acquisition of VBM.

Takeovers (2005–2006)

On October 11, 2005, Inco's CEO Scott Hand announced a friendly takeover bid to buy out the operations of longtime rival Falconbridge for $12 billion. If approved, the deal would have made Inco the world's largest producer of nickel. Davis's Xstrata (which already owned ~20% of Falconbridge shares) subsequently submitted a hostile takeover bid for Falconbridge, resulting in a bidding war between Inco and Xstrata.  The Xstrata bid was successful, but not before Falconbridge employed a poison pill to delay the acquisition, raising its share price from $28 to $62.50 in the meantime.

Teck Cominco submitted a hostile takeover bid to purchase Inco on May 8, 2006 for $16 billion if it agreed to abandon its takeover of Falconbridge. On June 26 of the same year, Phelps Dodge submitted a friendly takeover bid to purchase a combined Inco and Falconbridge for around $40 billion; that offer was also withdrawn because of the failure of the Inco-Falconbridge merger.

On August 14, 2006 Brazilian mining company CVRD extended an all-cash offer to buy Inco for $17 billion. That offer received approval from the Canadian government's investment review agency on October 19, and was accepted by Inco shareholders on October 23. Part of the takeover deal was that CVRD would operate Inco as a separate nickel mining division; all of CVRD's nickel operations, including mines at Onca Puma and Vermelho in Brazil, were transferred to Inco's management. Inco was delisted from the NYSE on November 16, 2006 and the TSX on January 5, 2007. According to its current web site, Inco is now a wholly owned subsidiary of Vale (formerly CVRD).

Vale has since changed the name of Vale-Inco to simply Vale, stating the change is "a milestone that aligns it more fully with other Vale operations worldwide and reflects its position as part of the world’s second largest mining company"

Recent history
In 2015, Vale was said to be exploring an IPO of its base metals unit for $30–35 billion, in order to lighten its debt load.

Criticism
In 2006 Inco was removed from the FTSE4Good Index for failing to meet their human rights criteria. The company has had disputes with native groups and environmental concerns over mine runoff.

Labour relations
Employees for Inco in Canada are represented by the United Steelworkers throughout all the mergers.  Because of the mergers, the United Steelworkers signed an agreement with all the unions that represent mining workers in countries where Vale/Inco operate to "work together cooperatively and strategically as global partners, to build the bargaining power of worker."  The unions include Confederação Nacional dos Trabalhadores no Setor Minera, SINTICIM, Union syndicale des ouvriers et employés de Nouvelle-Calédonie, Union des Syndicats des Travailleurs Kanak et Exploités, Fagforbundet for Industri og Energi, Construction, Forestry, Mining and Energy Union, and the United Steelworkers.

Current operations

Ontario, Canada

Coleman Mine, Vale's flagship nickel mine
Copper Cliff North Mine
Copper Cliff South Mine
Creighton Mine
Garson Mine
 Refinery in Port Colborne
Clarabelle Mill
Totten mine
Copper Cliff Smelter
Copper Cliff Nickel Refinery

Manitoba, Canada
Birchtree Mine
Thompson Mine

Newfoundland and Labrador, Canada
Voisey's Bay Mine
Long Harbour Nickel Processing Plant

Indonesia
Vale Inco's Indonesian joint venture PT Vale Indonesia Tbk, an Indonesian company which is 20 percent publicly owned (IDX:INCO), is located in Soroako. In August 2011, a dispute began because PT Inco broke its promise to build 2 smelters in Pomala and Bahodopi in 2005 and 2010 respectively, and to hand over 50,000 hectares of its 118,000-hectare concession to locals. Based on the latest feasibility study, only the Bahodopi smelter facility was possible. The dispute might go to court.
October 11, 2011: After starting operation of its third hydropower plant at Karebbe with an output of 130 megawatts (MW), the company would increase production from 73,000 metric tons to 120,000 metric tons per year over the next five years. The first and second hydropower plants are located in Larona and Balambano with a combined output of 365 MW. As part of its Corporate Social Responsibility plan, the company has given a total of 8 MW from the plants to Perusahaan Listrik Negara (Indonesian Government Electric Company) for free.

New Caledonia
Vale Inco New Caledonia

In popular culture
Inco is a central theme in the Stompin' Tom Connors song "Sudbury Saturday Night". More recently, the Creighton Mine, owned by Vale and hosting the Sudbury Neutrino Observatory, figures largely in the plot of Robert J. Sawyer's Neanderthal Parallax trilogy.

See also 

 1978 Inco strike
 2009-10 Vale-Inco strike

References

Vale S.A.
Nickel mining companies of Canada
Mining in Ontario
Companies based in Toronto
1902 establishments in Ontario
Non-renewable resource companies established in 1902
Economy of Greater Sudbury
History of Greater Sudbury
Canadian subsidiaries of foreign companies
Companies formerly listed on the London Stock Exchange
Former components of the Dow Jones Industrial Average
Canadian companies established in 1902